Mirza Mohammad Hussein Seifi Qazvini, better known as Emad al-Kottab was an Iranian calligrapher best known for being a member of the Punishment Committee.

He is credited with writing the calligraphic pieces on the Tomb of Ferdowsi and Dar ul-Funun, among other places.

He died on 17 July 1936, and was buried in Imamzadeh Abdollah, Ray.

His role was played by Jamshid Mashayekhi in the popular Iranian series Hezar Dastan.

Calligraphy examples

References 

Iranian calligraphers
People of the Persian Constitutional Revolution
People from Qazvin
1936 deaths
1861 births
19th-century Iranian people
20th-century Iranian people